Victoria Pena may refer to:
 Vicky Peña, Catalan actress
 Tori Pena, Victoria Pena, Irish pole vaulter